A slippery slope argument (SSA), in logic, critical thinking, political rhetoric, and caselaw, is an argument in which a party asserts that a relatively small first step leads to a chain of related events culminating in some significant (usually negative) effect. The core of the slippery slope argument is that a specific decision under debate is likely to result in unintended consequences. The strength of such an argument depends on whether the small step really is likely to lead to the effect. This is quantified in terms of what is known as the warrant (in this case, a demonstration of the process that leads to the significant effect). This type of argument is sometimes used as a form of fearmongering in which the probable consequences of a given action are exaggerated in an attempt to scare the audience. However, differentiation is necessary, since, in other cases, it might be demonstrable that the small step is likely to lead to an effect.  

The fallacious sense of "slippery slope" is often used synonymously with continuum fallacy, in that it ignores the possibility of middle ground and assumes a discrete transition from category A to category B. In this sense, it constitutes an informal fallacy. In a non-fallacious sense, including use as a legal principle, a middle-ground possibility is acknowledged, and reasoning is provided for the likelihood of the predicted outcome.
Other idioms for the slippery slope argument are the thin end/edge of the wedge, the camel's nose in the tent, or If You Give a Mouse a Cookie.

Slopes, arguments, and fallacies 
Some writers distinguish between a slippery slope event and a slippery slope argument. A slippery slope event can be represented by a series of conditional statements, namely:
if p then q; if q then r; if r then…z. 
The idea being that through a series of intermediate steps p will imply z. Some writers point out that strict necessity isn't required and it can still be characterized as a slippery slope if at each stage the next step is plausible. This is important for with strict implication p will imply z but if at each step the probability is say 90% then the more steps there are the less likely it becomes that p will cause z.

A slippery slope argument is typically a negative argument where there is an attempt to discourage someone from taking a course of action because if they do it will lead to some unacceptable conclusion. Some writers point out that an argument with the same structure might be used in a positive way in which someone is encouraged to take the first step because it leads to a desirable conclusion.

If someone is accused of using a slippery slope argument then it is being suggested they are guilty of fallacious reasoning, and while they are claiming that p implies z, for whatever reason, this is not the case. In logic and critical thinking textbooks, slippery slopes and slippery slope arguments are normally discussed as a form of fallacy, although there may be an acknowledgement that non-fallacious forms of the argument can also exist.

Types of argument 
Different writers have classified slippery slope arguments in different and often contradictory ways, but there are two basic types of argument that have been described as slippery slope arguments. One type has been called the causal slippery slope, and the distinguishing feature of this type is that the various steps leading from p to z are events with each event being the cause of the next in the sequence. The second type might be called the judgmental slippery slope with the idea being that the 'slope' does not consist of a series of events but is such that, for whatever reason, if a person makes one particular judgment they will rationally have to make another and so on. The judgmental type may be further sub-divided into conceptual slippery slopes and decisional slippery slopes.

Conceptual slippery slopes, which Trudy Govier calls the fallacy of slippery assimilation, are closely related to the sorites paradox so, for example, in the context of talking about slippery slopes Merilee Salmon can say, "The slippery slope is an ancient form of reasoning. According to van Fraassen (The Scientific Image), the argument is found in Sextus Empiricus that incest is not immoral, on the grounds that 'touching your mother's big toe with your little finger is not immoral, and all the rest differs only by degree.'"

Decisional slippery slopes are similar to conceptual slippery slopes in that they rely on there being a continuum with no clear dividing lines such that if you decide to accept one position or course of action then there will, either now or in the future, be no rational grounds for not accepting the next position or course of action in the sequence.

The difficulty in classifying slippery slope arguments is that there is no clear consensus in the literature as to how terminology should be used. It has been said that whilst these two fallacies "have a relationship which may justify treating them together", they are also distinct, and "the fact that they share a name is unfortunate". Some writers treat them side by side but emphasize how they differ. Some writers use the term slippery slope to refer to one kind of argument but not the other, but don't agree on which one, whilst others use the term to refer to both. So, for example, 
Christopher Tindale gives a definition that only fits the causal type. He says, "Slippery Slope reasoning is a type of negative reasoning from consequences, distinguished by the presence of a causal chain leading from the proposed action to the negative outcome."
Merrilee Salmon describes the fallacy as a failure to recognise that meaningful distinctions can be drawn and even casts the "domino theory" in that light.
Douglas N. Walton says that an essential feature of slippery slopes is a "loss of control" and this only fits with the decisional type of slippery slope. He says that, "The domino argument has a sequence of events in which each one in the sequence causes the next one to happen in such a manner that once the first event occurs it will lead to the next event, and so forth, until the last event in the sequence finally occurs…(and)…is clearly different from the slippery slope argument, but can be seen as a part of it, and closely related to it."

Metaphor and its alternatives
The metaphor of the "slippery slope" dates back at least to Cicero's essay Laelius de Amicitia (XII.41).  The title character Gaius Laelius Sapiens uses the metaphor to describe the decline of the Republic upon the impending election of Gaius Gracchus: "Affairs soon move on, for they glide readily down the path of ruin when once they have taken a start."

Thin end of a wedge
Walton suggests Alfred Sidgwick should be credited as the first writer on informal logic to describe what would today be called a slippery slope argument.

Sidgwick says this is "popularly known as the objection to a thin end of a wedge" but might be classified now as a decisional slippery slope. However, the wedge metaphor also captures the idea that unpleasant end result is a wider application of a principle associated with the initial decision which is often a feature of decisional slippery slopes due to their incremental nature but may be absent from causal slippery slopes.

Domino fallacy
T. Edward Damer, in his book Attacking Faulty Reasoning, describes what others might call a causal slippery slope but says,

Instead Damer prefers to call it the domino fallacy. Howard Kahane suggests that the domino variation of the fallacy has gone out of fashion because it was tied the domino theory for the United States becoming involved in the war in Vietnam and although the U.S. lost that war "it is primarily communist dominoes that have fallen".

Dam burst
Frank Saliger notes that "in the German-speaking world the dramatic image of the dam burst seems to predominate, in English speaking circles talk is more of the slippery slope argument" and that "in German writing dam burst and slippery slope arguments are treated as broadly synonymous. In particular the structural analyses of slippery slope arguments derived from English writing are largely transferred directly to the dam burst argument." 

In exploring the differences between the two metaphors he comments that in the dam burst the initial action is clearly in the foreground and there is a rapid movement towards the resulting events whereas in the slippery slope metaphor the downward slide has at least equal prominence to the initial action and it "conveys the impression of a slower 'step-by-step' process where the decision maker as participant slides inexorably downwards under the weight of its own successive (erroneous) decisions." Despite these differences Saliger continues to treat the two metaphors as being synonymous. Walton argues that although the two are comparable "the metaphor of the dam bursting carries with it no essential element of a sequence of steps from an initial action through a gray zone with its accompanying loss of control eventuated in the ultimate outcome of the ruinous disaster. For these reasons, it seems best to propose drawing a distinction between dam burst arguments and slippery slope arguments."

Other metaphors
Eric Lode notes that "commentators have used numerous different metaphors to refer to arguments that have this rough form. For example, people have called such arguments "wedge" or "thin edge of the wedge", "camel's nose" or "camel's nose in the tent", "parade of horrors" or "parade of horribles", "domino", "Boiling Frog" and "this could snowball" arguments. All of these metaphors suggest that allowing one practice or policy could lead us to allow a series of other practices or policies." Bruce Waller says it is lawyers who often call it the "parade of horribles" argument while politicians seem to favor "the camel's nose is in the tent".

Defining features of slippery slope arguments
Given the disagreement over what constitutes a genuine slippery slope argument, it is to be expected that there are differences in the way they are defined. Lode says that "although all SSAs share certain features, they are a family of related arguments rather than a class of arguments whose members all share the same form."

Various writers have attempted to produce a general taxonomy of these different kinds of slippery slope. Other writers have given a general definition that will encompass the diversity of slippery slope arguments. Eugene Volokh says, "I think the most useful definition of a slippery slope is one that covers all situations where decision A, which you might find appealing, ends up materially increasing the probability that others will bring about decision B, which you oppose."

Those who hold that slippery slopes are causal generally give a simple definition, provide some appropriate examples and perhaps add some discussion as to the difficulty of determining whether the argument is reasonable or fallacious. Most of the more detailed analysis of slippery slopes has been done by those who hold that genuine slippery slopes are of the decisional kind.

Lode, having claimed that SSAs are not a single class of arguments whose members all share the same form, nevertheless goes on to suggest the following common features.

Rizzo and Whitman identify slightly different features. They say, "Although there is no paradigm case of the slippery slope argument, there are characteristic features of all such arguments. The key components of slippery slope arguments are three:

Walton notes that these three features will be common to all slippery slopes but objects that there needs to be more clarity on the nature of the 'mechanism' and a way of distinguishing between slippery slope arguments and arguments from negative consequences.

Corner et al. say that a slippery slope has "four distinct components:

The alleged danger lurking on the slippery slope is the fear that a presently unacceptable proposal (C) will (by any number of psychological processes—see, e.g.) in the future be re-evaluated as acceptable."

Walton adds the requirement that there must be a loss of control. He says, there are four basic components, "One is a first step, an action or policy being considered. A second is a sequence in which this action leads to other actions. A third is a so-called gray zone or area of indeterminacy along the sequence where the agent loses control. The fourth is the catastrophic outcome at the very end of the sequence. The idea is that as soon as the agent in question takes the first step he will be impelled forward through the sequence, losing control so that in the end he will reach the catastrophic outcome. Not all of these components are typically made explicit..."

Non-fallacious usage
Logic and critical thinking textbooks typically discuss slippery slope arguments as a form of fallacy  but usually acknowledge that "slippery slope arguments can be good ones if the slope is real—that is, if there is good evidence that the consequences of the initial action are highly likely to occur. The strength of the argument depends on two factors. The first is the strength of each link in the causal chain; the argument cannot be stronger than its weakest link. The second is the number of links; the more links there are, the more likely it is that other factors could alter the consequences."

If the conditional if p then…z is understood strictly then slippery slope arguments about the real world are likely to fall short of the standards required for sound deductive reasoning and might be dismissed as a fallacy but, as Walton points out, slippery slope arguments are not formal proofs, they are practical arguments about likely consequences. Rizzo says, "first and foremost, slippery slopes are slopes of arguments: One practical argument tends to lead to another, which means that one justified action, often a decision, tends to lead to another. When we say that one argument (and its supported action) tends to lead to another, we mean that it makes the occurrence of the subsequent argument more likely, not that it necessarily makes it highly likely or, still less, inevitable. Hence the transition between arguments is not based on strict logical entailment." Essentially, if accepting p raises the probability of z sufficiently that the risk of it happening passes a tolerable threshold the argument will be considered reasonable. There is, of course, considerable room for disagreement as to the likelihood of z occurring and what would be a tolerable level of risk.

Kahane says, "The slippery slope fallacy is committed only when we accept without further justification or argument that once the first step is taken, the others are going to follow, or that whatever would justify the first step would in fact justify the rest." The problem then arises as to how to evaluate the likelihood that certain steps would follow.

Volokh's article "The Mechanisms of the Slippery Slope" sets out to examine the various ways in which making one decision might render another decision more likely. He considers such things as implementing A making B more cost effective and implementing A changing attitudes such that acceptance of B will become more likely. He says, "If you are faced with the pragmatic question "Does it make sense for me to support A, given that it might lead others to support B?," you should consider all the mechanisms through which A might lead to B, whether they are logical or psychological, judicial or legislative, gradual or sudden ... You should think about the entire range of possible ways that A can change the conditions—whether those conditions are public attitudes, political alignments, costs and benefits, or what have you—under which others will consider B." 

Volokh concludes by claiming that the analysis in his article "implicitly rebuts the argument that slippery slope arguments are inherently logically fallacious: the claim that A's will inevitably lead to B's as a matter of logical compulsion might be mistaken, but the more modest claim that A's may make B's more likely seems plausible." A similar conclusion was reached by Corner et al., who after investigating the psychological mechanism of the slippery slope argument say, "Despite their philosophical notoriety, SSAs are used (and seem to be accepted) in a wide variety of practical contexts. The experimental evidence reported in this paper suggests that in some circumstances, their practical acceptability can be justified, not just because the decision-theoretic framework renders them subjectively rational, but also because it is demonstrated how, objectively, the slippery slopes they claim do in fact exist.

See also 

 Boiling frog
 Broccoli mandate
 Broken windows theory
 Butterfly effect
 Creeping normality
 Euthanasia and the slippery slope
 First they came ...
 Foot-in-the-door technique
 Gateway drug theory
 Overton window
 Precautionary principle
 Precedent
 Reductio ad absurdum
 Salami slicing tactics
 Snowball effect
 Splitting (psychology)
 Trivial objections

References

External links 
The Slippery Slope Question
Propaganda Critic: Unwarranted extrapolation

Rhetorical techniques
Metaphors referring to places

Causal fallacies
Inductive fallacies

Legal doctrines and principles
American legal terminology